Bai Zhijian (November 1948) is the current chairman of the National People's Congress Overseas Chinese Affairs Committee, and former director of the Liaison Office of the Central People's Government in the Macau Special Administrative Region. He served as head of that office from July 2002 to January 2014. He joined the Chinese Communist Party in 1976. He has served as a member of the 16th and 17th Central Committees of the Chinese Communist Party.

References

External links
 Bai Zhijian's profile at xinhuanet.com

1948 births
Living people
People's Republic of China politicians from Hubei
Politicians from Wuhan
Political office-holders in Inner Mongolia
Political office-holders in Macau
Chinese Communist Party politicians from Hubei
Delegates to the 11th National People's Congress
Members of the Standing Committee of the 12th National People's Congress
Members of the 17th Central Committee of the Chinese Communist Party
Members of the 16th Central Committee of the Chinese Communist Party